Ross Fitzpatrick (born October 7, 1960) is a Canadian former professional ice hockey centre who played 20 games over parts of four seasons in the National Hockey League (NHL) for the Philadelphia Flyers. He is currently a pro scout with the Flyers.

Career statistics

Awards and honours

References

External links
 

1960 births
Living people
Binghamton Rangers players
Canadian ice hockey centres
Hershey Bears players
Sportspeople from Penticton
Maine Mariners players
Penticton Vees players
Philadelphia Flyers draft picks
Philadelphia Flyers players
Philadelphia Flyers scouts
Springfield Indians players
Wiener EV players
Western Michigan Broncos men's ice hockey players
Ice hockey people from British Columbia